Mokal or Mokal Singh ( & ), was the Maharana of Mewar Kingdom.

He was a son of Maharana Lakha Singh. Maharana Mokal has been described as a great builder, a trait which he had inherited from his father. He created various buildings along with completing those commenced by his father Lakha. He renovated Temple of Samadhishvar, which was built by King Bhoja Parmar, thus it is also called Mokal Ji Ka Mandir.

Background
Mokal was a younger son of Lakha Singh and was born of his wife Hansa bai, a princess of Mandore. His mother was not originally betrothed to his father, but rather to Lakha's eldest son Prince Chunda Sisodia. When the delegation from Mandore had arrived in Chittor to officialise the betrothal, Chunda was away from court. The ageing Lakha jested with the delegation, remarking that the proposal was obviously not meant for a "greybeard" like him. When Chunda later learned of the comment, the proud prince refused the marriage, for he could not accept a proposal which his father, though in jest, had publicly declined. The old Maharana, failing to change his son's mind and fearful of offending Hansa Bai's powerful family, was forced to marry the princess himself. In return, Chunda was required to give up his position as heir to the throne in favour of the eldest son born by Hansa Bai.

Reign
Maharana Lakha, the 4th Maharana of Mewar died in war, leaving young Mokal as his successor. Being a minor, his eldest brother Chunda Sisodia began to look after the state of affairs as promised to Rana Lakha. But Mokal's mother Hansa Bai disapproved of the influence that Chunda had over the nobles of Mewar. She questioned his integrity and doubted his intentions. Her resentment made Chunda leave Chittor and retire to Mandu, capital of Malwa. Rani Hansa Bai attained help from her brother Ranmal to administer the state of affairs on behalf of Mokal until he reached his majority.

Maharana Mokal had a brief stint as the ruler of Mewar, but rose to fame as the most celebrated warrior of his race. He defeated Nagour, Gujarat, and repelled an invasion by the Delhi Sultanate (Sayyid dynasty). But most importantly, he completed palaces that were commenced by his father Maharana Lakha and conspired to build more aesthetic structures. His assassination by his paternal uncles, Chacha and Mera, in 1433 brought an end to a great Maharana in the making at the young age of 24.

Rana Kumbha who was only 13 years old at the time of Mokal's death, ascended the throne at a crucial juncture in the history of Mewar. The young Kumbha may have had the most unfavourable situation after his father's untimely death, but the valour and vision of his father, Maharana Mokal, inspired him to emerge as one of Mewar's greatest rulers.

References

External links 
Maharana Mokal of mewar

Mewar dynasty
1409 births
1433 deaths
Hindu monarchs
15th-century Indian people